Circo Hermanos Vazquez is a Mexican circus established in 1969. The modern circus is American.

History 
The Circus Hermanos Vazquez started in the year 1969, during a period of cultural and social change in Mexico. Run by the brothers Jose Guillermo and Rafael Vazquez, the circus opened for the first time in Mexico City. Other participants were Aurora Vázquez and Antonia De Vazquez y José G. Vázquez.

The modern Circo Hermanos Vazquez is established in the United States, and is directed by Guillermo Jr, Jose, Jesus, Ramon, and Aldo Vazquez.

Gallery

References

External links 
 Circus Hermanos Vazquez official site

Circuses